Thinkhaya II of Toungoo (also Thinkhaya Nge and Sit Kya Thinkhaya) was viceroy of Toungoo (Taungoo) from 1415 to 1418/19. He succeeded his father in 1415 but died just over three years later when an army from an eastern Shan state raided Toungoo (Taungoo). He is also known as "Sit Kya Thinkhaya" (စစ်ကျ သင်္ခယာ, "Thinkhaya who Fell in Action").

References

Bibliography
 
 

Ava dynasty